The Hockey Player statue is a sculpture located at Championship Plaza, adjacent to the Prudential Center in Newark, New Jersey, home of the New Jersey Devils hockey team, installed in 2009. Entitled Stanley by the artist it has been colloquially known as Iceman, Man of Steel, and the Iron Man.

It was created by Jon Krawczyk, a native of Boonton Township, New Jersey, and a lifelong Devils fan. It was fabricated in his Malibu, California, studio and shipped cross country in three sections. A Prudential Center Opening Night hat and puck and a Scott Stevens jersey are encapsulated inside.

Of the work, Krawczyk said that it was made in a way to appear like blocks of ice molded together. “Especially with the stainless steel-look with the grind marks, it gives it the look that ice has when it breaks, and you get an almost diamond quality. I wanted to do something where you had that movement, and with lights nearby, the statue changes as you move around it. I wanted to have as much motion in it as possible, with it still being a solid sculpture.”

Krawczyk is also the creator of another statue at Prudential Center, The Salute, an homage to Martin Brodeur dedicated in 2016.

See also
 List of public art in Newark, New Jersey
 Sports in Newark, New Jersey

References

External links
 Roadside America
 Waymarking

Cultural infrastructure completed in 2009
Culture of Newark, New Jersey
Outdoor sculptures in New Jersey
2009 sculptures
Statues in New Jersey
Sculptures of men in New Jersey
Public art in Newark, New Jersey
New Jersey Devils